Syncope jimi is a species of frog in the family Microhylidae.It is endemic to Brazil and known from Humaitá, Amazonas, its type locality in Amazonas and from the Pará state. It is a common species within its range, found in leaf-litter of old-growth forests.

References

jimi
Endemic fauna of Brazil
Amphibians of Brazil
Taxonomy articles created by Polbot
Amphibians described in 2001
Taxa named by Ulisses Caramaschi
Taxobox binomials not recognized by IUCN